The 2022 NCAA Division I FCS football season, part of college football in the United States, is organized by the National Collegiate Athletic Association (NCAA) at the Division I Football Championship Subdivision (FCS) level. The regular season began on August 27 and ended on November 19. The postseason began on November 26, and, aside from any all-star games that are scheduled, ended on January 8, 2023, with the 2023 NCAA Division I Football Championship Game at Toyota Stadium in Frisco, Texas.

Conference changes and new programs

Membership changes for 2022

In addition to the listed membership changes, one current FCS member changed its institutional identity before the 2022 season. Dixie State University changed its forward-facing name to Utah Tech University on May 15, 2022, ahead of the legal name change on July 1. The athletic nickname remains Trailblazers.

In November 2021, Incarnate Word announced a move to the Western Athletic Conference for the 2022 season. Days before officially joining, on June 24, the school backed out of that plan, recommitting to the Southland Conference.

On April 8, the Southland Conference (SLC) announced that Lamar, one of four Texas schools that had left the SLC in 2021 to join the Western Athletic Conference, would return to the SLC in 2023. On July 11, 2022, Lamar announced it would accelerate its SLC return to the 2022–23 academic year.

Future membership changes
 On February 22, 2022, the Big South Conference and Ohio Valley Conference announced that they would merge their football leagues effective in 2023. Certain key details of the merger—specifically, whether the merged league would be run by the Big South or OVC, or become a separate entity—have yet to be announced.
 The same day also saw North Carolina A&T announce it would leave the Big South to join the Colonial Athletic Association (CAA). A&T's non-football sports joined the CAA on July 1, 2022, while football will join the technically separate entity of CAA Football in 2023.
 On April 4, the Missouri Valley Football Conference announced that Murray State would join that conference in 2023. Murray State left the OVC for the non-football Missouri Valley Conference, a separate entity from the MVFC (though closely related), in July 2022, but remained in OVC football for the 2022 season.
 On August 3, the CAA announced that Big South member Campbell would join both sides of the league in 2023.
 On October 14, Conference USA announced that Kennesaw State would start a transition to FBS after the 2022 football season and join C-USA in 2024.
 On December 20, the ASUN Conference and Western Athletic Conference, which had entered into a football-only partnership in 2021, announced that they would fully merge their football leagues effective in 2023. The new conference, tentatively known as the ASUN–WAC Football Conference, will feature ASUN members Austin Peay, Central Arkansas, Eastern Kentucky, and North Alabama, plus WAC members Abilene Christian, Southern Utah, Stephen F. Austin, Tarleton, and Utah Tech. The new football conference will play a six-game conference schedule in 2023 before starting round-robin play in 2024.

Rule changes
The following rule changes were recommended by the NCAA Football Rules Committee for the 2022 season.

 When players are disqualified for a targeting call in the second half or in overtime (which requires a carryover penalty of sitting out the first half of the next scheduled game), an appeals process will be available to allow the National Coordinator of Officials (currently Steve Shaw) to review tapes of the targeting penalty for consideration of not requiring the player to sit out the first half of the following game.
 Injury timeouts awarded due to "deceptive actions" during a game will also be able to reviewed by the National Coordinator of Officials to determine what sanctions, if any, against teams who use this tactic, enforced at the conference or school level.
 Blocking below the waist will only be permitted inside the tackle box by linemen and stationary backs. Blocks below the waist outside of the tackle box are not allowed.
 Defensive holding will remain a 10-yard penalty but will always carry an automatic first down.
 Codifying the rule change made shortly after the 2021 ACC Championship Game, ball carriers who simulate a feet-first slide will be declared down at that spot.
 Uniform rules would require the sock/leg covering to go from the shoe to the bottom of the pants, similar to the NFL rule.

Other headlines
 May 18 – The ASUN Conference and Western Athletic Conference announced that they had renewed their football alliance from the 2021 season. Each conference had 6 football members eligible for the 2022 FCS playoffs, the minimum number needed for an automatic playoff bid, but dropped to 5 such members with Jacksonville State (ASUN) and Sam Houston (WAC) starting FBS transitions in 2022, rendering them ineligible for the playoffs. The WAC's playoff-eligible membership later dropped to 3 when Incarnate Word backed out of its planned move to the WAC and Lamar accelerated its return to the Southland Conference to 2022. The 8 other members eventually competed for a single automatic berth in the FCS playoffs.
 June 2 – Police in Pocatello, Idaho announced that they had arrested Idaho State assistant coach DaVonte' Neal on May 25 at the request of the Maricopa County, Arizona sheriff's office on a warrant that includes a charge of first-degree murder in connection with a 2017 drive-by shooting. Neal was placed on administrative leave, with termination proceedings ongoing.
 August 31 – The Division I Board of Directors adopted a series of changes to transfer rules.
 Transfer windows were adopted for all Division I sports. Student-athletes who wish to be immediately eligible at their next school must enter the NCAA transfer portal within the designated period(s) for their sport. For FCS football, two windows were established: a 45-day window starting the day after postseason selections are made, and a spring window from May 1–15. Accommodations will be made for participants in the FCS championship game.
 Student-athletes who experience head coaching changes, or those whose athletic aid is reduced, canceled, or not renewed, may transfer outside designated windows without penalty.
 Transferring student-athletes will be guaranteed their financial aid at their next school through graduation.
 September 21 – Houston Baptist University announced a name change to Houston Christian University. The nickname of Huskies was not affected.
 December 9
 ESPN reported that the ASUN and WAC had agreed to form a new football-only conference that plans to start play in 2024. The initial football membership would consist of Austin Peay, Central Arkansas, Eastern Kentucky, and North Alabama from the ASUN, and Abilene Christian, Southern Utah, Stephen F. Austin, Tarleton, and Utah Tech from the WAC. UTRGV would become the 10th member upon its planned addition of football in 2025. The new football conference also reportedly plans to move "from what is currently known as FCS football to what is currently known as FBS football at the earliest practicable date." The ASUN and WAC confirmed the football merger, though not plans for an FBS move, on December 20.
 In the highest-scoring game in FCS playoff history, Incarnate Word defeated previously unbeaten Sacramento State 66–63. UIW quarterback Lindsey Scott Jr. threw four touchdown passes to bring his season total to 59, surpassing the previous FCS record of 57 held by Jeremiah Briscoe of Sam Houston in 2016. Scott ended the season with 60, having thrown one TD pass in UIW's 35–32 semifinal loss to North Dakota State.

Kickoff games

"Week Zero"
The regular season began on Saturday, August 27 with seven games in Week 0.
 
 FCS Kickoff (Cramton Bowl, Montgomery, Alabama): Jacksonville State 42, No. 10 Stephen F. Austin 17 
 MEAC/SWAC Challenge (Center Parc Stadium, Atlanta): Alabama State 23, Howard 13
 Florida State 47, Duquesne 7
 North Carolina 56, Florida A&M 24
 Western Kentucky 38, Austin Peay 27
 UNLV 52, Idaho State 21
 No. 23 Mercer 63, Morehead State 13

FCS team wins over FBS teams
 September 2, 2022
 William & Mary 41, Charlotte 24
 September 3
 Delaware 14, Navy 7
 September 10
 Eastern Kentucky 59, Bowling Green 57 7OT
 Incarnate Word 55, Nevada 41
 Holy Cross 37, Buffalo 31
 Weber State 35, Utah State 7
 September 17
 Southern Illinois 31, Northwestern 24
 September 24
 Sacramento State 41, Colorado State 10

Non-DI team wins over FCS teams
September 10, 2022:
Missouri S&T 17, Drake 14 OT
September 17
 Delta State 28, Mississippi Valley State 17
October 1
 Lane 28, Tennessee State 27 OT

Upsets
This section lists instances of unranked teams defeating ranked teams during the season.

Regular season
So far during the regular season, 13 unranked teams have defeated a ranked team.

 August 27, 2022
 Jacksonville State 42, No. 10 Stephen F. Austin 17 (FCS Kickoff)
 September 1
 Samford 27, No. 8 Kennesaw State 17
 September 10
 The Citadel 20, No. 9 East Tennessee State 17
 Southeast Missouri State 34, No. 17 Southern Illinois 31
 North Dakota 29, No. 24 Northern Iowa 27
 September 17
 North Carolina Central 45, No. 25 New Hampshire 27
 Furman 27, No. 18 East Tennessee State 14
 September 24
 Monmouth 49, No. 9 Villanova 42
 Elon 35, No. 14 William & Mary 31
 Austin Peay 31, No. 16 Eastern Kentucky 20
 Southeastern Louisiana 41, No. 4т Incarnate Word 35
 October 1
 North Dakota 48, No. 7 Missouri State 31
 Central Arkansas 49, No. 22 Austin Peay 20
 October 8
 Texas A&M–Commerce 31, No 19. Southeastern Louisiana 28
 October 15
 Idaho 30, No. 2 Montana 23
 Sam Houston State 25, No. 23 Eastern Kentucky 17
 October 22
 South Dakota 27, No. 14 Southern Illinois 24
 October 29
 Elon 27, No. 12 Delaware 7
 Eastern Kentucky 28, No. 15 Southeast Missouri State 23
 Northern Iowa 37, No. 20 Southern Illinois 36
 Jacksonville State 40, No. 25 Austin Peay 16
November 5
Kennesaw State 44, No. 15 UT Martin 27
November 12
UC Davis 44, No. 15 Idaho 26
Yale 24, No. 24 Princeton 20
 November 19
Western Carolina 32, No. 15 Chattanooga 29
Villanova 29, No. 20 Delaware 26

Regular season top 10 matchups
Rankings reflect the STATS Poll.
 Week 4
 No. 2т South Dakota State defeated No. 6 Missouri State, 28–14 (Robert W. Plaster Stadium, Springfield, MO)
 Week 7
 No. 2 South Dakota State defeated No. 1 North Dakota State, 23–21 (Fargodome, Fargo, ND)
 Week 8
 No. 2 Sacramento State defeated No. 7 Montana, 31–24 OT (Hornet Stadium, Sacramento, CA)
 No. 3 Montana State defeated No. 5 Weber State, 43–38 (Bobcat Stadium, Bozeman, MT)
 Week 10
 No. 2 Sacramento State defeated No. 5 Weber State, 33–30 (Stewart Stadium, Ogden, UT)

Rankings

The top 25 from the STATS and USA Today Coaches Polls.

Pre-season polls

Final rankings

Conference standings

Postseason
The FCS again features a 24-team postseason bracket: 11 teams decided via automatic bids issued to conference champions, and 13 at-large bids; the top eight teams were seeded.

Bowl game

Playoff qualifiers

Automatic berths for conference champions

At large qualifiers

Abstentions
Ivy League – Yale
Mid-Eastern Athletic Conference – North Carolina Central
Southwestern Athletic Conference – Jackson State

NCAA Division I playoff bracket

Coaching changes

Preseason and in-season
This is restricted to coaching changes that took place on or after May 1, 2022, and will include any changes announced after a team's last regularly scheduled games but before its playoff games. For coaching changes that occurred earlier in 2022, see 2021 NCAA Division I FCS end-of-season coaching changes.

End of season
This list includes coaching changes announced during the season that did not take effect until the end of the season.

See also
 2022 NCAA Division I FBS football season
 2022 NCAA Division II football season
 2022 NCAA Division III football season
 2022 NAIA football season

References